Nicolas Haxo (7 June 1749 – 20 March 1794) was a French general in the French Revolutionary Wars.

He took part in the War in the Vendée, and committed suicide to avoid capture at Les Clouzeaux.

References

1749 births
1794 deaths
French generals
French military personnel of the French Revolutionary Wars
French Republican military leaders killed in the French Revolutionary Wars
Republican military leaders of the War in the Vendée
People from Lorraine